Hermann Ottomar Friedrich Goedsche (12 February 1815 – 8 November 1878), also known as his pseudonym Sir John Retcliffe, was a German writer who was remembered primarily for his antisemitism.

Life and work

Goedsche was born in  Trachenberg, Silesia, then in the Kingdom of Prussia, today part of Poland. In 1848 he worked for the Neue Preußische (Kreuz-)Zeitung newspaper, together with prominent Germans like Theodor Fontane, Otto von Bismarck and George Hesekiel. In 1853, he travelled as a journalist to Turkey.

Goedsche worked in the genre of historical romance novel, as typified by Sir Walter Scott, Charles Sealsfield and Theodor Mügge, but he was also influenced by authors like Eugène Sue, Alexandre Dumas, père and George Hesekiel. Some of his works are critical of British colonialism. He was openly antisemitic and, although adopting an English pseudonym, he was a Prussian chauvinist who held a profound aversion against Britain and everything British. His political views on "perfidious Albion" are clearly expressed in his novels.

Goedsche worked as a postal employee, but in reality he was an agent provocateur for the Prussian secret police. He forged letters which were used as evidence to frame democratic leaders. In 1849, he was caught after forging evidence in the prosecution of political reformer Benedict Waldeck and had to leave the postal service.

He died at Bad Warmbrunn, today Cieplice Śląskie-Zdrój in Jelenia Góra, in 1878.

References in other works

Goedsche appears as a character in The Prague Cemetery by Umberto Eco. In the novel, the protagonist Simone Simonini approaches Goedsche in an unsuccessful effort to sell a forged antisemitic document to the Prussian secret police. Simonini later discovers to his dismay that Goedsche has appropriated the contents of the document for a scene in his novel Biarritz, leading other potential buyers for Simonini's forgery to think he had merely plagiarized it from Goedsche.

Works
Der letzte Wäringer. Historisch politische Novelle aus den letzten Tagen Constantinopels (1835,  as Theodor Armin)
 Vaterländische Romaneske aus den Zeiten Kaiser Friedrich Barbarossas (3 volumes, 1836, with Burg Frankenstein)
 Die Sage vom Ottilien-Stein (1836)
 Die steinernen Tänzer. Romantische Sage aus Schlesiens Vorzeit (2 volumes, 1837)
 Nächte. Romantische Skizzen aus dem Leben und der Zeit (2 volumes, 1838–1839)
 Schlesischer Sagen-, Historien- und Legendenschatz (1839–1840)
 Mysterien der Berliner Demokratie (1848, as Willibald Piersig)
 Enthüllungen (1849, anonymously)
 Die Russen nach Constantinopel! Ein Beitrag zur orientalischen Frage (1854)
 Sebastobol. Historisch-politischer Roman aus der Gegenwart (4 volumes, 1855–1857)
 Nena Sahib, oder: Die Empörung in Indien. Historisch-politischer Roman 1858-1859
 Villafranca, oder: Die Kabinette und die Revolutionen. Historisch-politischer Roman aus der Gegenwart (3 volumes, 1860–1862)
 Biarritz. Historisch-politischer Roman (3 volumes, 1868)
 Um die Weltherrschaft (sequel to Biarritz, 5 volumes, 1877–1879)

See also 
 Karl May
 Umberto Eco, The Prague Cemetery

Footnotes

References
 Excerpts dealing a. o. with Retcliffe

External links 
 German page about Retcliffe's life and work
 "The History of a Lie" - book that excerpts the "Cemetery" story

1815 births
1878 deaths
19th-century German journalists
19th-century German male writers
Antisemitism in Germany
German journalists
German male journalists
People from the Province of Silesia
People from Żmigród